The 2008–09 Oklahoma Sooners women's basketball team represented the University of Oklahoma in the 2008–09 NCAA Division I basketball season. The Sooners were coached by Sherri Coale. The Sooners are a member of the Big Twelve Conference and qualified for the Final Four.

Offseason

Preseason

Exhibition

Preseason WNIT

Regular season
Reserve Nyeshia Stevenson hit back-to-back 3-pointers and gave Oklahoma (ranked No. 6 in the ESPN/USA Today Poll, ranked No. 5 in the AP poll) its first lead of the game with 3:43 to play. The Sooners made an improbable comeback from a 26-point halftime deficit to shock the California Golden Bears (No. 7 ESPN/USA Today, No. 9 AP) 86-75 on Saturday night in the Basketball By The Bay Classic.
Cal led by 17 points, 69-52, before Oklahoma (8-2) closed the game with a 34-6 run. Stevenson finished with 21 points and Courtney Paris had 18 points and 13 rebounds to extend her consecutive streak of double-doubles dating to her freshman season to 102 games in Oklahoma's third straight victory since their loss to top-ranked Connecticut on Nov. 30. Cal had won the only other two meetings with Oklahoma but this marked the first matchup between the schools since Nov. 28, 1987, when the Bears won 81-66 in the Rainbow Wahine Classic in Honolulu.
January 4: The Sooners set a new school record for fewest points allowed in an 89-25 drubbing of North Carolina Central on Saturday. Whitney Hand scored 16 of her game-high 18 points in the opening half and Oklahoma blew out to a 50-15 lead in the first half.
Five Sooners scored in double-figures, including Courtney Paris, who finished with 11 points and 12 rebounds in only 22 minutes to stretch her NCAA record streak of consecutive double-doubles to 105 games.

Roster

Schedule

Notes
Abi Olajuwon scored season-high seven points in 12 minutes versus Cal State Bakersfield on December 12. She grabbed a season-high 12 rebounds against North Carolina Central on January 4.
Carlee Roethlisberger  scored a season-high 12 points versus Arizona State on November 21.
 Nyeshia Steveson shot 44.0 percent from the field, including a 36.4 percent (51-of-140) mark from 3-point range, and was 42-of-69 (.609) from the free throw line. She was named Big 12 Player of the Week following her remarkable play at the Basketball by the Bay Classic in San Jose, California on December 12 and 13. Stevenson scored a career-high 23 points and five assists in rout of Cal State Bakersfield  on December 12. She led OU's NCAA-record comeback victory against California on December 13) with a 21-point performance. All the points were scored in the second half, including the game-tying, go-ahead and game-winning field goals

Player stats

Postseason

NCAA basketball tournament
Oklahoma Cit Regional
Oklahoma 76, Prairie View 47
Oklahoma 69, Georgia Tech 50
Oklahoma 70, Pittsburgh 59
Oklahoma 74, Purdue 68
Final Four
Louisville 61, Oklahoma 59

Awards and honors
Nyeshia Stevenson, Big 12 Sixth Man Award
Nyeshia Stevenson, Big 12 Player of the Week (Dec. 15, 2009)
Nyeshia Stevenson, Led Big 12 in 3-point percentage during conference play with .414 percentage.
Nyeshia Stevenson, OU record streak of nine consecutive games making at least one 3-pointer (Dec. 3 vs. Creighton to Jan. 14 vs. Kansas State)

Team players drafted into the WNBA

See also
2008–09 Oklahoma Sooners men's basketball team

References

External links
Official Site

NCAA Division I women's basketball tournament Final Four seasons
Oklahoma
Oklahoma Sooners women's basketball seasons
Oklahoma
2008 in sports in Oklahoma
2009 in sports in Oklahoma